PYB or Pyb may refer to:

 Jeypore Airport (IATA: PYB), Odisha, India
 Pittsburgh Youth Ballet
 Price Your Bike (UCI code: PYB)
 Pymble railway station (station code: PYB)
 руб, abbreviation for the Russian ruble